Hexadecanal is an organic compound with the chemical formula C16H32O.

In biology 
Hexadecanal is found in human skin, saliva, and feces. It has a calming effect on mice.

A 2017 study found that neurotypical men demonstrate an increase in electrodermal activity when exposed to subliminal levels of hexadecanal while men with autism spectrum disorder do not.

In 2021, inhalation of hexadecanal was found to reduce aggression in men but to trigger aggression in women. Hexadecanal is one of the most abundant substances emitted by human babies from their heads, which may be an evolutionary survival mechanism to induce mothers to defend the baby and fathers to not attack it. But it is not yet known whether the amount of hexadecanal emitted by humans is sufficient to affect other humans.

References 

Alkanals